Gryllotalpa unispina is a species of mole cricket, in the G. gryllotalpa species group, found in Eastern Europe through to Manchuria. No subspecies are listed in the Catalogue of Life.

References

Gryllotalpidae
Insects described in 1874
Orthoptera of Europe